Eristalis dimidiata, the black-shouldered drone fly, is a species of hoverfly native to much of Canada and the eastern and northern United States. It flies year-round in southern areas and from late March to mid-November further north. It is one of the earliest hoverflies to fly in the spring, and as such likely overwinters as an adult. It lives primarily in forests.

Hoverflies get their names from the ability to remain nearly motionless while in flight. The adults are also known as flower flies for they are commonly found around and on flowers, from which they get both energy-giving nectar and protein-rich pollen. The larvae are aquatic filter-feeders of the rat-tailed type.

References

Further reading

External links

 

Eristalinae
Articles created by Qbugbot
Insects described in 1830